Aquafina is an American brand of purified bottled water that is produced by PepsiCo, consisting of both unflavored and flavored water. The Aquafina brand name is also licensed for use on multiple skin care products, including lip balm and wrinkle cream. It was first distributed in Wichita, Kansas in 1994, before becoming more widely sold across the United States, Canada, Spain, Peru (called "San Carlos"), Lebanon,  Turkey, the GCC countries, Iran, Egypt,  Morocco,  Vietnam, Pakistan, and India to compete with The Coca-Cola Company's Dasani and Dr. Pepper Snapple's Deja Blue. As of 2009, Aquafina represented 13.4 percent of domestic bottled water sales in the United States, making it the number one bottled water brand as measured by retail sales. Aquafina is also consistently ranked among the best water brands to buy.

Product variants 
Aquafina Pure Water, the primary unflavored product produced under the Aquafina brand, is derived from local municipal tap water sources and goes through a purification process that incorporates reverse osmosis, ultraviolet, and ozone sterilization. Beginning on July 27, 2007, a disclaimer was added to each bottle of Aquafina, stating the water comes from a "public source". In Canada, the current  bottle of water displays "Demineralized Treat Water". In response to concerns amongst environmental advocates who raised questions over the disclosure of water sources, a PepsiCo spokeswoman stated, "if this helps clarify the fact that the water originates from public sources, then it's a reasonable thing to do."

Flavored variations are also produced under the Aquafina brand name – all of which are labeled as containing no calories and no carbohydrates. Aquafina FlavorSplash, first introduced in 2005, is a flavored water product line which is non-carbonated and artificially sweetened with Sucralose. As of 2011, it is produced in six flavors: Grape, Strawberry Kiwi, Wild Berry, Raspberry, Lemon, and Peach Mango. Aquafina Sparkling is a carbonated line of flavored water; however its production was discontinued in the U.S. in late 2010. Other former products included Aquafina Alive (a low calorie, vitamin-enhanced water beverage introduced in 2007 and discontinued in 2009) and Aquafina plus+ (a low calorie flavored water labeled as a vitamin supplement) – both of which have been discontinued in the U.S. As of 2011, the "Sparkling" and "plus+" lines were still in production in other markets such as Canada.

Packaging

The bottled water industry has drawn criticism for the production and distribution of plastic product packaging, which consumes additional petrochemicals.

The packaging has evolved from its original iteration to partially offset the environmental impacts of production and shipment. This has primarily involved packaging weight reduction.

Sponsorship
Since shortly after its inception, the promotion of Aquafina has involved sports sponsorships. As of 2011, it is listed as being an official sponsor of Major League Soccer, the Professional Golfers' Association of America, the Arizona Diamondbacks, the Carolina Panthers and the New York Giants. Its packaging also states that it is the "official water of Major League Baseball", which has been the case since the beginning of the 2008 MLB season. In NASCAR, it is a sponsor for Hendrick Motorsports and Kasey Kahne.

Litigation
Charles Joyce and James Voigt won a $1.26 billion judgment against PepsiCo after saying that the company had created Aquafina by stealing their idea to sell purified bottled water. This judgment was vacated on November 6, 2009, when it was discovered that PepsiCo had failed to respond to the lawsuit due to a misplacement of the paperwork.

References

External links
 Official site 
 Aquafina Vietnam

Bottled water brands
PepsiCo brands
Products introduced in 1994